The 1995 SWAC men's basketball tournament was held March 10–12, 1995, at the Riverside Centroplex in Baton Rouge, Louisiana.  defeated , 75–62 in the championship game. The Tigers received the conference's automatic bid to the 1995 NCAA tournament as No. 15 seed in the Midwest Region.

Bracket and results

References

1994–95 Southwestern Athletic Conference men's basketball season
SWAC men's basketball tournament